Piotr Bagnicki (born 10 December 1980 in Kraków) is a Polish footballer (striker) playing last for Sandecja Nowy Sącz.

See also
Football in Poland

References

External links
 

1980 births
Living people
Polish footballers
MKS Cracovia (football) players
Proszowianka Proszowice players
Korona Kielce players
Zagłębie Sosnowiec players
Odra Wodzisław Śląski players
Podbeskidzie Bielsko-Biała players
Sandecja Nowy Sącz players
Footballers from Kraków
Association football forwards